Free rifle is the former name of four ISSF shooting events:

 300 metre rifle three positions
 300 metre rifle prone
 50 metre rifle three positions (for men; the female version was called standard rifle and then sport rifle)
 50 metre rifle prone (for men; the female version was called standard rifle and then sport rifle)